The Swingin' Nutcracker is a 1960  RCA Victor album by American jazz trumpeter and arranger Shorty Rogers performing compositions adapted from The Nutcracker by Pyotr Ilyich Tchaikovsky.

Reception

Allmusic awarded the album 3 stars.

Track listing 
All compositions adapted from The Nutcracker Suite by Tchaikovsky and arranged by Shorty Rogers.

 "Like Nutty Overture (Finale)" - 5:23
 "A Nutty Marche (Marche)" - 3:28
 " Blue Reeds (Reed Flute Blues)" - 5:27
 "The Swingin' Plum Fairy (Dance of the Sugar Plum Fairy)" - 2:58
 "Snowball (Waltz of the Snowflakes)" - 3:03
 "Six Pak (Trépak)" - 2:44
 "Flowers of the Cats (Waltz of the Flowers)" - 3:28
 "Dance Expresso (Coffee)" - 2:55
 "Pass the Duke (Pas de Deux)" - 2:51
 "China Where? (Tea Dance)" - 2:09
 "Overture for Shorty (Overture in Miniature)" - 4:01

Personnel 
Shorty Rogers - conductor, arranger
Johnny Audino, Conte Candoli, Ray Triscari, Jimmy Zito - trumpet 
Harry Betts, Frank Rosolino, Kenneth Shroyer - trombone
George Roberts  - bass trombone
Bud Shank - flute, alto saxophone 
Art Pepper - alto saxophone
Jimmy Guiffre - clarinet
Bill Holman, Richie Kamuca, Bill Perkins - tenor saxophone 
Chuck Gentry - baritone saxophone
Pete Jolly, Lou Levy - piano
Joe Mondragon - bass 
Mel Lewis - drums

References 

Shorty Rogers albums
1960 Christmas albums
RCA Records Christmas albums
Albums arranged by Shorty Rogers
Christmas albums by American artists
Swing Christmas albums
The Nutcracker